David Emil Neumann (born October 5, 1941) is a politician in the Canadian province of Ontario. He was the mayor of Brantford from 1980 to 1987 and served in the Legislative Assembly of Ontario as a Liberal from 1987 to 1990. After several years out of politics, he was elected as a city councillor for Brantford's fifth ward in the 2010 municipal election. He retired from the Brantford City Council in 2018.

Early life and career
Neumann was born in Montreal, Quebec, and moved with his family to a dairy farm near Waterford, Ontario, as a child. He earned a degree from McMaster University in Hamilton and worked as a secondary school teacher at Pauline Johnson Collegiate. He later coordinated adult education for his school board and was president of the Brant Ontario Secondary School Teachers Federation (OSSTF).

Neumann supported The Waffle and was part of a group of Brantford-area New Democrats who favoured running party candidates at the municipal level. He ran for Brantford's fourth council ward in 1972 and nearly defeated veteran councillor Charles Ward for the second position.

Municipal politician
Neumann was elected as an alderman for Brantford's fifth ward in 1976 and was re-elected without opposition in 1978. He became the city's mayor in 1980, defeating right-wing candidate Andy Woodburn and incumbent Charles Bowen, and was re-elected without serious opposition in 1982 and 1985. As mayor, Neumann helped expand Mohawk College, negotiated an agreement with Brant County that allowed Brantford to annex five thousands acres of land, concluded an agreement with the Six Nations to construct the Brantford Southern Access Road, and lobbied for the construction of Highway 403 to Ancaster.

Neumann was also in office when the city's Market Street was shut down and the unsuccessful Market Square Mall was constructed. He has rejected that suggestion that he was to blame for these developments, noting that he voted against Market Street's closure while on council, that the mall was approved by council as a whole, and that no-one could have predicted the mall's giant Eaton's store would close.

As mayor, Neumann served on the board of the Association of Municipalities of Ontario. He joined the Liberals in early 1987.

Provincial politician
He ran for the Ontario legislature in the 1971 provincial election as a New Democrat, finishing third against Liberal Party leader Robert Nixon in Brant.

Neumann was elected to the Ontario legislature for Brantford in the 1987 provincial election, defeating New Democrat Jack Tubman and Progressive Conservative incumbent Phil Gillies. The Liberals won a landslide majority government in this election under David Peterson's leadership, and Neumann entered the legislature as a government backbencher. He was parliamentary assistant to the Minister of Municipal Affairs from 1987 to 1988 and chaired the standing committee on social development from 1988 to 1990.

In a 1989 interview, he cited a new telecommunications discovery centre, an industrial park, and the completion of Highway 403 as the Peterson government's main achievements for his area. Neumann also lobbied for increased Via Rail service; in August 1990, he announced that a previously cancelled commuter rail service to Brantford would reopen.

The Liberals were defeated in the 1990 provincial election, and Neumann lost his seat to New Democrat Brad Ward. He ran again in the 1995 provincial election but lost to Progressive Conservative candidate Ron Johnson.

Since 1990
Neumann resumed his teaching career after leaving political life, retiring from the Brant County Board of Education in 1997. He ran for mayor of Brantford in 2000, but, despite an endorsement from the Brantford Expositor, he finished an unexpectedly poor third against incumbent Chris Friel.

From 1998 to 2005, Neumann worked as executive director of the Ontario Association of Adult and Continuing Education School Board Administrators (CESBA), based in Brantford. He welcomed a $78,000 federal grant for literacy training in 2004. He was also president of the local Kiwanis society in 2002–03.

Neumann returned to elected office in the 2010 municipal election, winning the second seat in Brantford's fifth ward. He serves on the brownfields community advisory committee, the social services committee, and the Brantford Heritage Committee.

Federal politics
Neumann supported Jean Chrétien's bid to lead the Liberal Party of Canada in 1993 and continued to support Chrétien's leadership in the years that followed.

He supported Marguerite Ceschi-Smith's bid for the Liberal nomination in Brant in the buildup to the 2004 federal election. Ceschi-Smith lost to Lloyd St. Amand.

Electoral record

Provincial

Municipal

References

External links
Profile at the Legislative Assembly of Ontario

1941 births
Living people
Ontario Liberal Party MPPs
Mayors of Brantford